Counter Terrorism and Intelligence Bureau, more commonly known as CTIB, is a Bangladeshi elite covert intelligence unit of the Directorate General of Forces Intelligence, trained by DGFI, CIA and other special forces around the world. The unit is tasked with combatting terrorism, gathering information about any internal or external threat to Bangladesh and counter-attack. Since the formation of CTIB in 2006, terrorist activities have decreased in Bangladesh.

Administration
Counter Terrorism and Intelligence Bureau is operated by a Director who reports to DGFI. The United States and Bangladesh signed a Counterterrorism Cooperation Initiative on 22 October 2013, to enhance bilateral co-operation.

Operations
 2016- Operation Thunderbolt
 2017- Operation Twilight

Training
CTIB holds joint training with DGFI and United States Special Forces.

See also 
 National Committee for Intelligence Coordination
 National Security Intelligence
 Directorate General of Forces Intelligence

References

Bangladeshi intelligence agencies
Military of Bangladesh
Counterterrorism in Bangladesh
Counterterrorist organizations